William Reeves (1881 – 13 September 1962) was an Australian cricketer. He played three first-class cricket matches for Victoria between 1907 and 1910.

See also
 List of Victoria first-class cricketers

References

External links
 

1881 births
1962 deaths
Australian cricketers
Victoria cricketers
Cricketers from Melbourne